St. Lawrence Saints ice hockey may refer to either of the ice hockey teams that represent St. Lawrence University:
St. Lawrence Saints men's ice hockey
St. Lawrence Saints women's ice hockey